The Israel Defense Forces 162nd Armor Division, also known as the Steel Formation (Utzbat HaPlada), is a regular-service armor division in the IDF. It is subordinate to the Southern Regional Command. The division is led by Brigadier-General Moti Baruch.

It played a critical role in the 1973 Yom Kippur War in the Sinai under Abraham Adan.

Although attached to the Central Command at the time, the 162nd Division participated in battles against Hezbollah, from July to August 2006, in the western sector of southern Lebanon and north of Bint Jbail. The division reached the strategic Litani River, that separates Hezbollah-controlled Lebanon from central Lebanon. The division participated in additional skirmishes with Hezbollah as late as September 27.

Units 

 162nd Armor Division
 37th "Ram" (Reserve) Armor Brigade
 84th "Giv'ati" Infantry Brigade
 401st "I'kvot Ha-Barzel"/"Iron Trails" Armor Brigade
 933rd "Nahal" Infantry Brigade
 215th "Amud ha-Esh"/"Pillar of Fire" Artillery Regiment
 55th "Dragon" Artillery Battalion (M109 "Doher")
 402nd "Reshef" Artillery Battalion (M109 "Doher")
 403rd "Eyal" (Reserve) Artillery Battalion (M109 "Doher")
 Target Acquisition Company
 Division Signal Battalion

References

Divisions of Israel
Central Command (Israel)